Samuel Smith Bowne (April 11, 1800 – July 9, 1865) was an American lawyer and politician who served one term as a U.S. Representative from New York from 1841 to 1843.

Biography
Born in New Rochelle, New York; Bowne moved to Otsego County with his parents, who settled near Morris, New York, and attended the common schools. He engaged in agricultural pursuits and married Cordelia Shove, daughter of Benjamin and Amy Tabor Shove, on November 26, 1820. The couple had four children, Samuel, Richard, Cordelia, and Charles.

Career
Bowne moved to Laurens, Otsego County, New York in 1825, and studied law. He was admitted to the bar in 1832 and commenced practice in Laurens. He moved to Cooperstown, New York, and served as member of the State assembly in 1834.

Tenure in Congress 
Elected as a Democrat to the Twenty-seventh Congress, Bowne served as United States Representative for the nineteenth district of New York from March 4, 1841, to March 3, 1843.

Career after Congress 
Not a candidate for renomination in 1842, he moved to Rochester, New York, in 1846 and continued the practice of his profession. He served as judge of Otsego County from 1851 to 1855, then resumed the practice of law.

Death
Bowne died on his farm near Morris, New York, on July 9, 1865 (age 65 years, 89 days). He is interred at Friends Burying Ground, Morris, New York.

References

External links

The Political Graveyard
Govtrack US Congress

1800 births
1865 deaths
Politicians from New Rochelle, New York
Democratic Party members of the United States House of Representatives from New York (state)
People from Morris, New York
19th-century American politicians
Lawyers from New Rochelle, New York
Winthrop family